The 6th Mounted Rifles were a light cavalry regiment of the Royal Prussian Army. The regiment was formed 1 October 1910 in Erfurt.

See also
List of Imperial German cavalry regiments

References

Mounted Rifles of the Prussian Army
Military units and formations established in 1910
1910 establishments in Germany